Andrew Hughes may refer to:

Andrew Hughes (actor) (1908–1996), Turkish born actor
Andrew Hughes (police officer) (1956–2018), Fijian Commissioner of Police
Andrew Hughes (footballer, born 1978), English footballer
Andrew Hughes (footballer, born 1992), Welsh footballer
Andrew Hughes (musicologist); see List of University of Toronto people
Andrew Hughes (politician) (1902–1996), Australian politician
Andrew Hughes (rugby union) (born 1995), English rugby union player
Andy Hughes (1965–2009), music producer

See also 
 Hughes (surname)